Senator Corning may refer to:

Erastus Corning 2nd (1909–1983), New York State Senate
Joy Corning (1932–2017), Iowa State Senate